Noss may refer to:

Places 
 Isle of Noss, a small, previously inhabited island in Shetland, Scotland
 Noss, Caithness, near Wick, Highland, Scotland
Noss Head Lighthouse, located nearby
 Noss, Dartmouth, the name given to an Iron Age hill fort situated close to Dartmouth in Devon, England
 Noss, Mainland Shetland, a location in Scotland
 Noss Mayo, village in south-west Devon, England, about 6 miles south-east of Plymouth

People with the surname 
 Arthur Noss (1897–1917), British World War I flying ace credited with nine aerial victories
 Milton Ernest "Doc" Noss (1905–1949), American businessman and gold prospector who reported found the Victorio Peak treasure
 Reed Noss (born 1952), conservation biologist at the University of Central Florida

Other 
 Naval Ocean Surveillance System
 Noss, fictional alien, see Gravity (Star Trek: Voyager)
 Ah W Noss (Arabic: آه ونص), 2004 album from Lebanese singer Nancy Ajram

See also 
 NOS (disambiguation)